Iceland has a notable cinema film industry, with many Icelandic actors and directors having gone on to receive international attention. The most famous film, and the only one to be nominated for the Academy Award, is Börn náttúrunnar (Children of Nature), a 1991 film directed by Friðrik Þór Friðriksson. This  brought Icelandic cinema to the international scene, which has since grown, with films such as Nói Albínói (Noi the Albino) by Dagur Kári, heralded as descendants of the Icelandic film tradition.

The annual Edda Awards are the national film awards of Iceland.

Films

See also
 Cinema of the world

References

External links 
Icelandic Film Centre
Icelandic Film Database
Kvikmyndapod, a podcast about  21st-Century Icelandic Cinema